Rain or Shine is a 2017 South Korean television series starring Lee Jun-ho and Won Jin-ah, with Lee Ki-woo and Kang Han-na. It is about people's love, hope, and dreams despite their painful past. It aired as JTBC's first series on Mondays and Tuesdays at 23:00 (KST) time slot from December 11, 2017 to January 30, 2018.

Synopsis
The story of two individuals who lost their loved ones in a tragic accident and try to carry on with their lives as if they are not in pain. Throughout that time, they slowly fall in love.

Cast

Main
 Lee Jun-ho as Lee Kang-doo, a former athlete who dreamt of becoming a professional soccer player but suddenly lost his father in an accident and had to undergo three years of rehabilitation for his injured legs.
 Nam Da-reum as young Lee Kang-doo
 Won Jin-ah as Ha Moon-soo, a young woman who lost her younger sister in an accident but lives life fiercely and stays strong while taking care of her mother.
 Park Si-eun as young Ha Moon-soo
 Lee Ki-woo as Seo Joo-won, an architect at a construction firm.
 Kang Han-na as Jung Yoo-jin, team leader of external relations at the construction firm where Joo-won works.

Supporting

People around Kang-doo
 Kim Hye-jun as Lee Jae-young, Kang-doo's younger sister who is a doctor at a local hospital.
 Yoon Se-ah as Ma-ri, Kang-doo's friend who runs a nightclub.
 Kim Kang-hyun as Sang-man, Kang-doo's neighbor.
 Na Moon-hee as Jeong Sook-hee, a medicine seller.

People around Moon-soo
 Yoon Yoo-sun as Yoon-ok, Moon-soo's mother.
 Ahn Nae-sang as Ha Dong-chul, Moon-soo's father.
 Han Seo-jin as Ha Yeon-soo, Moon-soo's younger sister who died in an accident.
 Park Hee-von as Kim Wan-jin, Moon-soo's friend who is a webtoon writer.
 Kim Min-kyu as Jin-young, Wan-jin's assistant.
 Choi Hyo-eun as Hwa-sai

People around Joo-won
 Nam Gi-ae as Joo-won's mother.
 Tae In-ho as Jung Yoo-taek, Yoo-jin's older brother.
 Park Gyu-young as So-mi, Moon-soo's workmate.

Special appearances
 Kim Jin-woo as Lee In-yong
 Hong Kyung as Choi Sung-jae
 Shin Hyun-been as an architect

Production
 The series marks Lee Jun-ho's first lead role in a TV series, as well as rookie actress Won Jin-ah's first-ever major role. She was selected for the role out of 120 candidates.
 The first script reading of the cast was held on August 22, 2017.

Original soundtrack

Part 1

Part 2

Part 3

Part 4

Part 5

Part 6

Part 7

Ratings

Awards and nominations

References

External links
  
 
 

Korean-language television shows
JTBC television dramas
2017 South Korean television series debuts
2018 South Korean television series endings
South Korean romance television series
South Korean melodrama television series
Television series by Celltrion Entertainment